Guangzhou Chimelong Tourist Resort is a theme park resort located in Guangzhou, Guangdong, China and owned by Chimelong Group. The resort currently consists of one theme park, one circus venue, two zoological parks, one waterpark, and three hotels.

Parks

Chimelong Paradise 
Chimelong Paradise, the resort's flagship park, is one of China's largest and most popular theme parks and currently features more than 60 attractions.

Chimelong Water Park 
Chimelong Water Park is the most visited waterpark in the world.

Chimelong Safari Park 

Chimelong Safari Park is an expansive zoological park featuring many rare animals from around the world.

Chimelong Birds Park 
Chimelong Birds Park is a zoological park primarily displaying birds.

Entertainment Venue 
Performances of the Chimelong International Circus take place daily at Guangzhou Chimelong Tourist Resort's large indoor theater.

Hotels 
There are three hotels on site:

 Chimelong Hotel – The resort's main hotel with 1,500 eco-themed rooms and suites and nine dining locations
 Chimelong Panda Hotel – 1500 rooms themed to a Chinese cartoon about panda cub triplets
 Panyu Xiangjiang Hotel – 150 rooms plus multipurpose meeting rooms

References

External links 

 

 
Amusement parks in China